Honeyguides (family Indicatoridae) are near passerine birds in the order Piciformes. They are also known as indicator birds, or honey birds, although the latter term is also used more narrowly to refer to species of the genus Prodotiscus. They have an Old World tropical distribution, with the greatest number of species in Africa and two in Asia. These birds are best known for their interaction with humans. Honeyguides are noted and named for one or two species that will deliberately lead humans (but, contrary to popular claims, not honey badgers) directly to bee colonies, so that they can feast on the grubs and beeswax that are left behind.

Description 

Most honeyguides are dull-colored, though some have bright yellow coloring in the plumage. All have light outer tail feathers, which are white in all the African species.

They are among the few birds that feed regularly on wax—beeswax in most species, and presumably the waxy secretions of scale insects in the genus Prodotiscus and to a lesser extent in Melignomon and the smaller species of Indicator. They also feed on waxworms which are the larvae of the waxmoth Galleria mellonella, on bee colonies, and on flying and crawling insects, spiders, and occasional fruits. Many species join mixed-species feeding flocks.

Behavior

Guiding

Honeyguides are named for a remarkable habit seen in one or two species: guiding humans to bee colonies. Once the hive is open and the honey is taken, the bird feeds on larvae and wax. This behavior has been studied in the greater honeyguide; some authorities (following Friedmann, 1955) state that it also occurs in the scaly-throated honeyguide, while others disagree. Wild honeyguides understand various types of human calls that attract them to engage in the foraging mutualism. In northern Tanzania, honeyguides partner with Hadza hunter-gatherers, and the bird assistance has been shown to increase honey-hunters' rates of finding bee colonies by 560%, and led men to significantly higher yielding nests than those found without honeyguides. Contrary to most depictions of the human-honeyguide relationship, the Hadza did not actively repay honeyguides, but instead, hid, buried, and burned honeycomb, with the intent of keeping the bird hungry and thus more likely to guide again. Some experts believe that honeyguide co-evolution with humans goes back to the stone-tool making human ancestor Homo erectus, about 1.9 million years ago. Despite popular belief,  no evidence indicates that honeyguides guide the honey badger; though videos about this exist, there have been accusations that they were staged.

Although most members of the family are not known to recruit "followers" in their quest for wax, they are also referred to as "honeyguides" by linguistic extrapolation.

Breeding

The breeding behavior of eight species in Indicator and Prodotiscus is known. They are all brood parasites that lay one egg in a nest of another species, laying eggs in series of about five during a period of 5-7 days. Most favor hole-nesting species, often the related barbets and woodpeckers, but Prodotiscus parasitizes cup-nesters such as white-eyes and warblers. Honeyguide nestlings have been known to physically eject their hosts' chicks from the nests and they have needle-sharp hooks on their beaks with which they puncture the hosts' eggs or kill the nestlings.

African honeyguide birds are known to lay their eggs in underground nests of other bee-eating bird species. The honeyguide chicks kill the hatchlings of the host using their needle-sharp beaks just after hatching, much as cuckoo hatchlings do. The honeyguide mother ensures her chick hatches first by internally incubating the egg for an extra day before laying it, so that it has a head start in development compared to the hosts' offspring.

Species 
The Indicatoridae contains seventeen species in four genera:

FAMILY: INDICATORIDAE
 Genus: Indicator
 Spotted honeyguide, I. maculatus
 Scaly-throated honeyguide, I. variegatus
 Greater honeyguide, I. indicator
 Malaysian honeyguide, I. archipelagicus
 Lesser honeyguide, I. minor
 Willcocks's honeyguide, I. willcocksi
 Least honeyguide, I. exilis
 Dwarf honeyguide, I. pumilio
 Pallid honeyguide, I. meliphilus
 Yellow-rumped honeyguide, I. xanthonotus
 Genus: Melichneutes
 Lyre-tailed honeyguide, M. robustus
 Genus: Melignomon
 Yellow-footed honeyguide, M. eisentrauti
 Zenker's honeyguide, M. zenkeri
 Genus: Prodotiscus
 Cassin's honeybird, P. insignis
 Green-backed honeybird, P. zambesiae
 Brown-backed honeybird, P. regulus

References

External links

Don Roberson's Bird Families of the World

Brood parasites
Honeyguides
Symbiosis